Fadden may refer to:

People
 Arthur Fadden (1894–1973), briefly Prime Minister of Australia in 1941
 Harry Delmar Fadden (1882–1955), United States Navy sailor and recipient of the Medal of Honor
 Richard Fadden (born 1951), director of the Canadian Security Intelligence Service (CSIS)
 Tom Fadden (1895–1980), American actor

Variant
 Ruth Faden, professor and Executive Director of The Johns Hopkins Berman Institute of Bioethics

Places
 Fadden, Australian Capital Territory, a suburb of Canberra named after Arthur Fadden

Other uses
 Division of Fadden, an electorate in the Australian House of Representatives, also named after Arthur Fadden

See also
 McFadden (disambiguation)